Laboratory, is a Ukrainian publishing house founded in the year 2020 by Anton Martynov. It publishes fiction and nonfiction books.

History 
Laboratory publishing house was founded in 2020 in Kyiv by businessman and former co-owner of Nash Format publishing house Anton Martynov.

In 2020, Laboratory launched two podcasts — the Laboratory of Nonfiction and the Laboratory of Sense.

In 2022, the publishing house started to work with Ukrainian authors.

Authors 

 Biil Gates
 David McKean
 Vaclav Smil
 Daniel Yergin
 Vivek Murthy
 Frank Wilczek
 Katie Mack and other.

Concept 
Laboratory publishes western publications and works by Ukrainian authors.

It presents books in hardcover, paperback, audio and e-book.

References

External links 

 Das Wichtigste ist, das Team zu retten, Verlegen im Krieg: Kateryna Malko über ihren Alltag

Book publishing companies
Publishing companies of Ukraine
Companies based in Kyiv
Publishing companies established in 2020